Ward is a surname of either Old English or Old Gaelic origin, common in English-speaking countries.

The Old English name derives from an occupational surname for a civil guard/keeper of the watch, or alternately as a topographical surname from the word werd ("marsh"). The Old Irish surname is linguistically unrelated, and derives from Mac an Bháird ("son of the Bard"), a bárd being a storyteller or poet. An Irish variant is O'Ward. The oldest public record of the surname dates to 1176.

In the 2010 United States Census, Ward was the 79th most common surname. It is the 78th most common surname in Ireland. It was the 31st most common surname in the 1991 UK census and 40th in 2001 census, and in 2007, was found to be the most common surname in Lutterworth, Leicestershire.

Surname

A
 Aaron Ward (disambiguation), multiple people
 Adam Ward (disambiguation), multiple people
 Sir Adolphus Ward (1837–1924), English historian
 Adrian Ward (disambiguation), multiple people
 Al Ward (1927–2021), American football executive
 Alan Ward (disambiguation), multiple people
 Albert Ward (disambiguation), multiple people
 Alexander Ward (born 1990), British tennis player
 Alf Ward (1883–1926), English footballer
 Alfred Dudley Ward (1905–1991), British Army officer
 Alfred G. Ward (1908–1982), U.S. Navy admiral
 Algy Ward (born 1959), English musician
 Alice Ward (disambiguation), multiple people
 Alie Ward (born 1976), American television personality
 Amelita Ward (1923–1987), American actress
 Andre Ward (born 1984), American boxer
 Andrew Ward (disambiguation), multiple people
 Anita Ward (born 1956), American musician
 Ann Ward (born 1991), American fashion model
 Anne Ward (suffragist) (1825–1896), British-New Zealand temperance leader
 Anne V. Ward (1877–1971), Scottish-born American educator
 Anthony Ward (born 1957), British theatre designer
 Arnold Ward (1876–1950), British journalist and politician
 Artemas Ward (disambiguation), multiple people
 Ashleigh Ward (born 1994), New Zealand footballer
 Ashley Ward (born 1970), English footballer

B
 Barbara Ward (1914–1981), British economist and writer
 Barbara E. Ward (1919–1983), British anthropologist
 Barry Ward (disambiguation), multiple people
 Ben Ward (disambiguation), multiple people
 Bernard Ward (disambiguation), multiple people
 Bill Ward (disambiguation), multiple people
 B. J. Ward (disambiguation), several people:
 B. J. Ward (actress) (born 1944), American actress
 BJ Ward (poet) (born 1967), American poet
 B. J. Ward (American football) (born 1981), American football player
 Brad Ward (born 1956), Canadian politician
 Brandon Ward (born 1972), American soccer player
 Brennan Ward (born 1988), American mixed martial artist
 Brent Ward (born 1979), New Zealand rugby union player
 Brian Ward (born 1973), American football coach and player
 Brian Ward (cricketer) (born 1944), English cricketer
 Bryan Ward (born 1972), American baseball player
 Bryan Ward (priest) (1906–1989), Australian clergyman
 Burt Ward (born 1946), American actor

C
 Callan Ward (born 1990), Australian rules footballer
 Cam Ward (born 1984), Canadian hockey player
 Cam Ward (politician) (born 1971), American politician
 Carisa Zhavia Ward (born 1986), American singer-songwriter
 Caroline Ward (born 1969), Australian cricket player         
 Catherine Ward (born 1987), Canadian ice hockey player
 Channing Ward (born 1992), American football player
 Charles Ward (disambiguation), multiple people
 Charvarius Ward (born 1996), American football player
 Chris Ward (disambiguation), multiple people
 Christopher Ward (disambiguation), multiple people
 Chuck Ward (1894–1969), American baseball player
 Claire Ward (born 1972), British politician
 Clara Ward (1924–1973), American singer
 Clarissa Ward (born 1980) British-American journalist for CNN
 Clifford T. Ward (1944–2001), English singer-songwriter
 Corey Ward, American rapper
 Cory Ward (born 1974), American curler

D
 Daniel Ward (disambiguation), multiple people
 Danielle Ward (born 1978), British comedian and writer
 Darrell Ward (1964–2016), American television personality
 Darren Ward (disambiguation), multiple people
 Daryle Ward (born 1975), American baseball player
 Dave Ward (disambiguation), multiple people
 David Ward (disambiguation), multiple people
 Dennis Ward (disambiguation), multiple people
 Denzel Ward (born 1997), American football player
 Derek Ward (disambiguation), multiple people
 Don Ward (disambiguation), multiple people
 Donald Ward (1914–??), English rugby league footballer
 Donald J. Ward (1930–2004), American folklorist
 Duane Ward (born 1964), American baseball player

E
 Ebenezer Ward (1837–1917), Australian politician
 Ed Ward (disambiguation), multiple people
 Eddie Ward (1899–1963), Australian politician
 Edmund Ward (disambiguation), multiple people
 Edward Ward (disambiguation), multiple people
 Edwin Ward (1919–2005), English priest
 Elijah Ward (1816–1882), American politician
 Elisha Ward (1804–1860), American politician
 Elizabeth Grace Ward (born 1961), American actress
 Elliot Ward (born 1993), English footballer
 Elliott Ward (born 1985), English footballer
 Emily Ward (1850–1930), English teacher
 Eric Ward (disambiguation), multiple people
 Evelyn Ward (1923–2012), American actress
 Evelyn Svec Ward (1921–1989), American fiber artist

F
 Felicity Ward (born 1980), Australian comedian
 Frances Ward (1611–1697), English peer
 Frances Ward (priest) (born 1959), Anglican priest and theologian
 Frank Ward (disambiguation), multiple people
 Fred Ward (1942–2022), American actor
 Freda Dudley Ward (1894–1983), English socialite
 Frederick Ward (disambiguation), multiple people

G
 Gareth Ward (born 1981), Australian politician
 Garry Ward, rugby league footballer
 Gary Ward (disambiguation), multiple people
 Gemma Ward (born 1987), Australian supermodel and actor
 Geoffrey C. Ward (born 1940), American historian
 George Ward (disambiguation), multiple people
 Gerald Ward (disambiguation), multiple people
 Gerry Ward (disambiguation), multiple people
 Glenn Ward (born 1957), Australian rules footballer
 Greg Ward (born 1995), American football player
 Gregory Ward, American linguist

H
 H. J. Ward (1909–1945), American illustrator
 Hansford Ward (1817–1903), Australian ship captain
 Harry Ward (disambiguation), multiple people
 Helen Ward (disambiguation), multiple people
 Henry Ward (disambiguation), multiple people
 Herbert Ward (disambiguation), multiple people
 Hines Ward (born 1976), American football player
 Holcombe Ward (1878–1976), American tennis player
 Horace Ward (1927–2016), American judge
 Hugh J. Ward (1871–1941) American comic actor

J
 Jack Ward (1553–1622), English pirate
 Jack Ward (ice hockey), Canadian hockey player
 Jacob Ward (born 1974), American journalist
 James Ward (disambiguation), multiple people
 Jamie Ward (born 1986), British footballer
 Janet Ward (1925–1995), American actress
 Jared Ward (born 1988), American long-distance runner
 Jason Ward (disambiguation), multiple people
 Jay Ward (1920–1989), American animator
 Jay Ward (baseball) (1938–2012), American baseball player and coach
 Jeff Ward (disambiguation), multiple people
 Jennifer Ward (disambiguation), multiple people
 Jeremy Ward (disambiguation), multiple people
 Jerry Ward (disambiguation), multiple people
 Jesmyn Ward (born 1977), American novelist
 Jessie Ward (born 1979), American television producer
 Jessie Ward (actress) (born 1982), American actress
 Jihad Ward (born 1994), American football player
 Jillian Ward (born 2005), Filipino actress and model
 Jim Ward (disambiguation), multiple people
 Joanne Ward (born 1975), British tennis player
 Joe Ward (disambiguation), multiple people
 Joel Ward (disambiguation), multiple people
 John Ward (disambiguation), multiple people
 JoJo Ward (born 1997), American football player
 Jonathan Ward (disambiguation), multiple people
 Joseph Ward (disambiguation), multiple people
 Joshua Ward (1685–1761), English doctor
 Joshua John Ward (1800–1853), American slaveholder
 Julia Ward (1900–1962), American cryptologist
 Julia Rush Cutler Ward (1796-1824), American poet

K
 Kate Lucy Ward (1833-1915), British composer
 Keith Ward (born 1938), British philosopher
 Kelli Ward (born 1969), American politician
 Kelly Ward (born 1956), American actor
 Ken Ward (born 1935), Australian rules footballer
 Ken Ward Jr., American reporter
 Kenny Ward (born 1963), Scottish footballer
 Kevin Ward (disambiguation), multiple people
 Kim Ward, American politician
 Kyle Ward (disambiguation), multiple people

L
 Lafe Ward (1925–2013), American lawyer and politician
 Lance Ward (born 1978), Canadian hockey player
 Larry Ward (disambiguation), multiple people
 Lauren Ward (born 1970), American singer and actress
 Laurie Ward (1911–??), Australian rugby league footballer
 Lawrence Ward (disambiguation), multiple people
 Lesley Ward, Australian mathematician
 Lesley Ward (diver) (born 1970), British diver
 Leslie Ward (1851–1922), British caricaturist
 Leslie Ward (cricketer) (1908–1981), English cricketer
 Lester Frank Ward (1841–1913), American biologist and sociologist
 Liam Ward (1930–2022), Irish jockey
 Linda Ann Ward (born 1947), Canadian skater
 Lorenzo Ward (born 1967), American football coach
 Luca Ward (born 1960), Italian actor and dubber
 Lyman Ward (disambiguation), multiple people

M
 M. Ward (born 1973), American singer-songwriter and guitarist
 Maitland Ward (born 1977), American pornographic actress
 Marcus Ward (disambiguation), multiple people
 Margaret Ward (disambiguation), multiple people
 Mark Ward (disambiguation), multiple people
 Mary Ward (disambiguation), multiple people
 Martin de Porres Ward (1918–1999), U.S. Black Catholic missionary 
 Matthew Ward (disambiguation), multiple people
 May Alden Ward (1853–1918), American author
 McLain Ward (born 1975), American show jumping competitor
 Megan Ward (born 1969), American actress
 Michael Ward (disambiguation), multiple people
 Micheal Ward (born 1995), English actor
 Micky Ward (born 1965), American boxer
 Mike Ward (disambiguation), multiple people
 Mitchell Ward, American football player
 Monica Ward (born 1965), Italian actress and voice actress
 Morgan Ward (1901–1963), American mathematician

N
 Nancy Ward (1738–1822/1824), American Cherokee leader
 Nancy L. Ward, American politician
 Natalie Ward (born 1975), Australian softball player
 Natalie Ward (politician), Australian politician
 Nathan Ward (born 1981), Canadian hockey player
 Nathaniel Ward (disambiguation), multiple people
 Neil B. Ward (1914–1972), American meteorologist
 Nicholas Ward (disambiguation), multiple people
 Nick Ward (disambiguation), multiple peoplep

O
 Orlando Ward (1891–1972), American Army general

P
 Pat Ward (1957–2012), American politician
 Patricio O'Ward (born 1999), Mexican auto racing driver
 Patrick Ward (disambiguation), multiple people
 Paul Ward (disambiguation), multiple people
 Peter Ward (disambiguation), multiple people
 Pendleton Ward (born 1982), American animator
 Philip Ward (1924–2003), British Army officer
 Philip Henry Ward Jr. (1886–1963), American stamp dealer
 Phillip Ward (born 1974), American football player
 Preston Ward (1927–2013), American baseball player

R
 Rachel Ward (born 1957), English-born Australian actress
 Rebecca Ward (born 1990), American fencer
 Robbie Ward (born 1995), English rugby league footballer
 Robert Ward (disambiguation), multiple people
 Robin Ward (disambiguation), multiple people
 Rod Ward (born 1937), Australian rules footballer
 Rodger Ward (1921–2004), American racing driver
 Rodney Ward (figure skater), (born 1941), British skater
 Roger Ward (born 1936), Australian actor
 Ron Ward (disambiguation), multiple people
 Ronald Ward (1901–1978), British actor
 Ronald James Ward (1966–2014), American serial killer
 Ryan Ward (disambiguation), multiple people

S
 Sallie Ward (1827–1896), American socialite
 Samuel Ward (disambiguation), multiple people
 Sarah Ward (disambiguation), multiple people
 Scooter Ward (born 1970), American musician
 Sela Ward (born 1956), American actress
 Selwyn Ward, American actor
 Shayne Ward (born 1984), British singer and actor
 Simon Ward (1941–2012), British actor
 Singin' Sammy Ward (1929–1996), American singer
 Sophie Ward (born 1964), British actor
 Steve Ward (disambiguation), multiple people
 Susan Ward (born 1976), American actor

T
 T. J. Ward (born 1986), American football player
 Ted Ward, Welsh rugby union footballer
 Terron Ward (born 1992), American football player
 Terry Ward (1939–1963), English footballer
 Terry W. Ward (1885–1929), American attorney and judge
 Theodore Ward (1902–1983), American playwright
 Thomas Ward (disambiguation), multiple people
 Tim Ward (disambiguation), multiple people
 Timothy Ward (born 1968), English cricketer
 Tony Ward (disambiguation), multiple people
 Tracy Posner Ward (born 1962), American animal rights activist
 Troy G. Ward (born 1962), American ice hockey coach
 Turner Ward (born 1965), American baseball player and coach
 Tyler Ward (born 1988), American musician

V
 Vanessa Ward (born 1963), Australian high jumper
 Victoria Ward (disambiguation), multiple people
 Vicki Ward (born 1969), Australian politician
 Vicky Ward (born 1969), British-American journalist and author
 Vonda Ward (born 1973), American boxer and basketball player

W
 Walter Ward (disambiguation), multiple people
 Ward Wellington Ward (1875–1932), American architect
 Warren Ward (basketball) (born 1989), Canadian basketball player
 Warren Ward (footballer) (born 1962), English footballer
 William Ward (disambiguation), multiple people
 Wilkie Ward (1884–1958), English Footballer

Z
 Zack Ward (born 1970), Canadian actor                
 Zhavia Ward (born 2001), American singer-songwriter
 ZZ Ward (born 1986), American singer-songwriter

Fictional characters
 Alice Ward, a character in Utopia
 Charles Ward, an H.P. Lovecraft character
 Grant Ward, character in the television show Agents of S.H.I.E.L.D.
 J.D. Ward, main antagonist from High Noon, Part II: The Return of Will Kane
 Judith Ward, a preloaded character in The Sims 4: Get Famous
 Luke Ward, character in the television program, The O.C.
 Mycroft Ward, main antagonist from The Raw Shark Texts
 Thomas J. Ward, main protagonist from The Wardstone Chronicles
 Risa Ward, a main character in the book series Unwind
 Victor Ward, main character of the Bret Easton Ellis novel Glamorama
 Vivian Ward, title character in the film Pretty Woman

See also

References

English-language surnames
Irish families
Occupational surnames
English-language occupational surnames